The Young Guns is a 1956 American Western film directed by Albert Band and written by Louis A. Garfinkle. The film stars Russ Tamblyn, Gloria Talbott, Perry Lopez, Scott Marlowe, Wright King and Walter Coy. The film was released on September 12, 1956, by Allied Artists Pictures.

Plot

Cast
	 
Russ Tamblyn as Tully Rice
Gloria Talbott as Nora Bawdre
Perry Lopez as San Antone
Scott Marlowe as Knox Cutler
Wright King as Jonesy 
Walter Coy as Sheriff Jim Peyton
Chubby Johnson as Rongo Jones / Grandpa
Myron Healey as Deputy Nix
Jim Goodwin as Georgie Briggs 
Rayford Barnes as Kid Cutler
I. Stanford Jolley as Felix Briggs
Emory Parnell as Padgett
• Tom London as Lookout (uncredited)

Production
The film was based on a story by Albert Band and Lou Garfinkle. In 1955 it was bought by Hayes Gotez who would produce the film for Allied Artists.

Gloria Talbot was cast in March 1956. The film was called "A Western about juvenile delinquency." Tamblyn was borrowed from MGM.

Reception
The Los Angeles Times called it "chillingly violent if not always coherent."

In 1956 Band and Garfinkle signed a six picture deal with Allied. In 1957 Band and Garfinkle bought the rights to the film to turn it into a TV series.

References

External links
 

1956 films
1950s English-language films
American Western (genre) films
1956 Western (genre) films
Films directed by Albert Band
1950s American films
American black-and-white films